The Lanz Bulldog was a series of tractors manufactured by Heinrich Lanz AG in Mannheim, Baden-Württemberg, Germany. Production started in 1921 with the Lanz HL, and various versions of the Bulldog were produced up to 1960, one of them being the Lanz Bulldog D 9506. John Deere purchased Lanz in 1956 and started using the name "John Deere Lanz" for the Lanz product line. A few years after the Bulldog was discontinued the Lanz name fell into disuse. The Lanz Bulldog was one of the most popular German tractors, with over 220,000 of them produced in its long production life. The name "Bulldog" is widely used in Germany as a synonym for tractors even today, especially in Bavaria.

Engine 

The Lanz Bulldog was built with a single-cylinder, two-stroke Akroyd engine – the so-called Bulldog engine – that was designed by Fritz Huber. The Bulldog engine was installed horizontally, with the ignition device – the hot bulb – facing forward. It has crankcase scavenging, and intake ports instead of valves. Due to its few moving parts – the piston, crank assembly and flywheel, the fuel injection system and oil system are the only parts that move – it was simple to manufacture, operate and maintain. In the Bulldog engine, fuel is sprayed under low pressure onto the hot-bulb ignition device, where the fuel is ignited and gradually undergoes combustion. This makes the Bulldog engine thermodynamically inefficient, but it requires neither a carburettor like an Otto engine, nor high compression like a Diesel engine. It does not require a special fuel to operate; it can burn regular fuels like diesel fuel or petrol, but also a wide variety of low grade fuel oils – even waste oils. This made the Bulldog engine reasonably economical to operate, despite its high fuel consumption. The original Bulldog had evaporative cooling. Later models use a thermosiphon cooler. For starting, the ignition device has to be heated to ignition temperature using a blow torch, then the engine is hand-cranked with the steering wheel. Late Bulldog engines have a redesigned hot-bulb with direct injection; they were offered with electric glowplugs and an electric starter motor. Lanz sold these as "Halbdiesel" (half diesel) and "Volldiesel" (full diesel) models, albeit that the engine was not a diesel engine. The Bulldog engine was made with various different displacements, with the 4.8 and 10.3 litre versions being the most common ones.

130 mm × 170 mm,  cm³
140 mm × 170 mm,  cm³
145 mm × 170 mm,  cm³
150 mm × 210 mm,  cm³
160 mm × 190 mm,  cm³
160 mm × 210 mm,  cm³
170 mm × 210 mm,  cm³
190 mm × 220 mm,  cm³
210 mm × 210 mm,  cm³
190 mm × 260 mm,  cm³
225 mm × 260 mm,  cm³

Lanz Iberica
Bulldogs were also produced in Spain by Lanz Iberica S.A. at Getafe near Madrid.  A total of 17,100 tractors were built from 1956 to 1963.

Bulldog Copies
The Bulldog design was copied in other countries by several different manufacturers. While some of these copies were legitimately produced under license from Bulldog, most of them were built with each respective builder's own frame and body design, being powered by unlicensed copies of the patented Bulldog hot-bulb engine. Some of these examples are:

France
"Le Percheron" was a licensed copy of the 25 HP hot-bulb Bulldog, built by Société Nationale de Construction Aeronautic du Centre (SNCAC) at Colombe in France from about 1939.  It is believed that nearly 3,700 were built before production ceased in 1956.

Australia
The KL Bulldog was produced by Kelly & Lewis of  Springvale, Victoria, Australia from 1948 to December 1952.  Just over 860 were built, based on the 35 HP Model N Bulldog.

Poland
Ursus produced a copy of the 45 HP Bulldog at the ZM Ursus factory (Zakłady Mechanicze Ursus) in Poland in Ursus near Warsaw from 1947, called the C-45.  It was replaced by the C-451 in 1957, and from 1960 the production was moved to Zakłady Mechaniczne in Gorzów Wielkopolski.  About 55,000 Ursus C-45/C-451 were built from 1947 until 1965.

Argentina
In 1951 a copy of the 55 HP Bulldog was produced by Industrias Aeronáuticas y Mecánicas del Estado in Argentina.  The tractor was called "Pampa" and the badge on the front read IAME. From 1955 the tractor was produced by Dirección Nacional de Fabricaciones e Investigaciones Aeronáuticas and the badge was changed to DINFIA. A total of 3,760 Pampas were produced from 1951 to 1960.

Similar tractors
The Bulldog was similar to other European hot-bulb tractors that were being produced around the same time. Some of these examples are the SF Vierzon from France, the Landini tractor from Italy, and the HSCS from Hungary. The Field Marshall that was produced in England, was a similar design to the Bulldog hot-bulb engine with the exception of an internally designed vaporing plate which replaced the conventional externally located hot-bulb, this internal design required ignition papers in place of the external blow lamp to start the engine.

References

External links

Tractors
John Deere
1921 establishments in Germany